John St John Joseph  (born 25 June 1970), also known as Johnathan Joseph and professionally as DJ Spoony, is a British DJ and radio presenter. He is a member of the UK garage production trio, the Dreem Teem.

Early career
Dj Spoony was born in Hackney, East London to British West Indian parents. His career started on London Underground (a leading pirate radio station in the mid-nineties), forming the trio the Dreem Teem with Mikee B (of Top Buzz) and Timmi Magic. With the Dreem Teem, he joined Kiss 100 in December 1997, followed by bringing UK garage nationally to BBC Radio 1 in January 2000. They went on to win a prestigious Sony Award in their first year.

DJ Spoony was a resident DJ at the UK's top garage and R&B club night 'Twice as Nice' for 7 years, mixing and compiling three gold selling compilation albums for the brand. He has had residencies in Ibiza and Ayia Napa for over 10 years as well as making annual visits to many other Mediterranean islands.

Solo radio work
He went on to host the Weekend Breakfast show on Radio 1 between October 2003 and September 2006. Listeners could join the Early Doors Club, play Judge Fudge, and become a Local Legend. Another long-running feature was Mills & Spoon (a nameplay of the Mills & Boon books), in which Scott Mills read out love stories every Sunday. On 31 July 2006, the BBC announced that Spoony was to leave Radio 1 after six years with the station to concentrate on Five Live work. His early breakfast slot was replaced by Fearne Cotton and Reggie Yates. Spoony presented his final Radio 1 show on 17 September 2006.

He then commenced hosting 606 on Radio 5 Live as well as 'Spoony Meets...', a series of shows in which he interviewed various personalities from British football, including Alex Ferguson, Jose Mourinho and David Beckham.

Between 2014 and 2017, he hosted a UK garage show on Rinse FM.

Spoony joined Radio 2 with a new show in February 2019. On 25 October 2021, he stood in for Steve Wright for one day only. He regularly deputises for  Ken Bruce, Trevor Nelson and Craig Charles.
On the 22nd July 2022, DJ Spoony joined BBC Radio 2 permanently and can be heard every Friday from 9-11pm with his show ‘The Good Groove’

Television work
In 2006, Spoony took part in the fourth series of Strictly Come Dancing partnering with Ola Jordan. They were eliminated in the third week of the competition. He also appeared on The Weakest Link and A Question of Sport, and was a winning contestant on the celebrity version of quiz Mastermind, choosing "The Life and Times of Ray Charles" as his specialist subject.

He is a host for Premier League TV's Fanzone as well as Weekend Warm Up broadcasting worldwide from the UK. He has been a part of the presentation team for 7 years.

Other media work
According to Spoony, he has hosted 'many red carpet' movie premières in London, interviewing the cast of films such as SpiderMan, Bad Boys 2, Hancock, Rambo and Men in Black 3. His love of sport has earned him roles working alongside the organising committee for the Olympic Games 2012 in football (soccer) and basketball. In June 2008, he was one of the celebrities who took part in a "six pack in six weeks" challenge for the magazine Men's Health.

Spoony has played DJ sets at rugby league events such as the Magic Weekend and Super League Grand Final. For the 2015 Super League Grand Final at Old Trafford (the home of Manchester United), self-confessed Liverpool FC fan Spoony played their famous anthem "You'll Never Walk Alone" as part of his set. He was the stadium DJ when Carl Froch fought George Groves at Wembley Stadium in 2014. He has hosted the Annual P.F.A Awards and in 2021 the M.I.Ts awarding a Life Time Achievement award to Pete Tong.

Honours
Spoony was awarded the British Empire Medal (BEM) in the 2023 New Year Honours for services to charities through music during Covid-19.

Personal life
Spoony enjoys playing golf and is a big fan of sport in general. He supports Liverpool F.C. He has played several times in the Gary Player Invitational charity golf series to raise funds for children around the world, and won the competition in 2009. Spoony is also good friends with golfer Ian Poulter and DJ'd at his wedding at Woburn Sculpture Gallery in 2007.

He has combined his love of golf and enjoyment supporting worthwhile causes by organising an annual golf tournament at Stoke Park Club, Buckinghamshire, for The Golf Roots Foundation. This event has been running since 2002 and is always shown on Sky Sports.

In 2009, Spoony became the first patron of the Jude Brady Foundation; the foundation was set up by a friend to help raise awareness of still birth in the UK after his son was still born in June 2006. Spoony has worked tirelessly since becoming a patron and helped organise a charity golf day and gala ball for the foundation in 2010.

He has two daughters.

Discography

Studio albums
 Garage Classical (2019), Sony Music

Mixes/compilations
 Twice as Nice / Twice as Nice Ayia Napa (1999), React
 Twice as Nice pres. Essential Grooves (2003), Warner

Singles
"Sweet like Chocolate" (featuring Lily Allen) (2019), Since 93
"Flowers" (featuring Sugababes) (2019), Since 93 - UK Dance #26

References

External links

The Good Groove with DJ Spoony (BBC Radio 2)

1970 births
Living people
People from Hackney Central
English radio DJs
English record producers
Black British radio presenters
Black British DJs
DJs from London
BBC Radio 1 presenters
BBC Radio 2 presenters
English people of Grenadian descent
UK garage musicians
Electronic dance music DJs
Recipients of the British Empire Medal